Comfort and Joy is a 2003 American made-for-television romantic drama film directed by Maggie Greenwald and starring Nancy McKeon as Jane Berry. The film originally aired on the Lifetime cable network on December 1, 2003.

Plot
Jane Berry is a successful, single entrepreneur who is vice president of ad agency, has a luxury apartment, and drives a Jaguar.

On Christmas, when she is driving to a company party, she gets lost and hits a pole. Sam (Steven Eckholdt) comes to her rescue to get her out of her car (which is now a station wagon) and tells her that he has been her husband for the past 10 years and she has two children with him. Jane realizes that she is in an alternate reality. Ten years ago, she dumped her boyfriend and left her job for Sam. Jane is confused by her new world, where she is a new Jane who is completely different from the old one.

Slowly, Jane acclimates her new life. After an argument with her parents at Christmas dinner, she is completely impressed by Sam and her family. She kisses Sam but finds herself back the Jaguar after the accident. Sam comes to her rescue, but he doesn't know who she is. She tells Sam that she knows him and is in love with him, which Sam is shocked to hear. They move together to Sam's house to lead a happy life in the future.

Cast
Nancy McKeon as Jane Berry
Steven Eckholdt as Sam
Paul Dooley as George
Andrew Chalmers as Troy Keller
Jordy Benattar as Heather Keller
Maria Herrera as Alison Phillips
Dixie Carter as Frederica

See also
 List of Christmas films

References

External links

2003 television films
2003 films
2003 romantic drama films
American Christmas films
American romantic drama films
Lifetime (TV network) films
Films directed by Maggie Greenwald
Films scored by David Mansfield
Christmas television films
2000s Christmas drama films
American drama television films
2000s American films